Ahmad Majid, was a Faujdar of Mughal Bengal's Sylhet Sarkar during the reign of Emperor Aurangzeb and governorship of Subahdar Azim-ush-Shan.

Career
In 1699, Majid granted some land to Bharat Das Vaishnav of Dulali in the Dhakadakshin Pargana as devatra. The land was later inherited by his son, Bhabananda Vaishnav.

Several months later, Majid was succeeded as the Faujdar of Sylhet by Abdullah Shirazi.

See also
History of Sylhet
Lutfullah Shirazi

References

Rulers of Sylhet
17th-century rulers in Asia
17th-century Indian Muslims